Sam K. Harrison or Sam Kazar Harootenian (December 12, 1908 – January 1, 1994) was a corporal in the United States Army during World War II. He served nine months overseas and participated in the campaigns of Northern France, Ardennes, Rhineland and Central Europe.

Harrison is known as "the man who refused to die" because of the numerous injuries he sustained while in combat. During one battle, Harrison lost his left arm, kneecap, and three fingers on his right hand. Although he was pronounced dead, he survived. Despite 27 months in hospitals and 33 surgical operations, he went on to found and head two successful corporations and attain high civic honors.

Early life
Of Armenian descent, Harrison was born December 12, 1908 in Chicago, Illinois, the second son of Kazar, who was a farmer near Fowler, California and Mariam (Kazarian) Harrison, a housewife, both from Kharpert, Ottoman Empire. He had one brother, George, and two sisters, Agnes and Syble.

Military service
Harrison joined the US Army and was assigned to the 280th Field Artillery Battalion which was activated at Camp Cooke (today Vandenberg Air Force Base) in California. The Battalion was then moved to Fort Sill in Oklahoma in February 1944, for a three-month stay at Field Artillery School. He then trained for overseas duty at Camp Polk, Louisiana.

World War II
Harrison was sent overseas to the European theatre of World War II. He embarked from Boston on the USS West Point on September 7, 1944, and landed at Utah Beach, Normandy, on September 18, 1944. He soon engaged in the Battle of the Hurtgen Forest and by February 6, 1945, he was on the West Side of the Roer River. As part of the first Artillery Battalion of the 9th Army, he crossed the Roer on February 24.

Harrison recalled his part in the push to the Rhine: "Our artillery scouts made their own reconnaissance and went into position as an isolated unit; reached the Rhine on March 5, 1945; crossed the Rhine on March 27, 1945." He was then part of the drive to the Elbe and reached Hanover by April 2, 1945.

In Hanover and just three weeks before the war ended, Harrison and other members of the No. 1 gun of the 280th Field Artillery were hit by a German gun directed from an observation tower mounted on a steeple of a church. The German gun, which had a direct hit on their gunning position, caused three deaths, wounded five and stunned twenty-five men. Of the living wounded, Harrison was nearest to death; his left arm was torn off near the shoulder, he lost three fingers on his right hand, his right knee had been crushed and his pelvic bones were shattered. When Harrison demanded a tourniquet, one of the combatants ripped off his web belt and tied it around the leg. A moment later a medic applied a real tourniquet. Then Harrison was transported to a field hospital where he underwent emergency surgeries. According to Harrison, the doctors stated that "we'd better list him as killed in action" and another said "He'll die on the operating table."

Harrison survived the surgeries, was transferred to a hospital in Paris but was not expected to live. Even though Harrison showed signs of recovery, his recovery slowed down considerably when news of both his parents death reached him.

Once Harrison was stable, he was sent back to the United States and transferred to the Bushnell Hospital in Brigham City, Utah for more surgery. Harrison was then transferred to the Letterman Army Hospital in San Francisco where he was given a wheelchair and intensive rehabilitation. After surgeons had grafted bones into his crushed knee, Harrison began to walk again with the help of a cane and leg brace.

Later life
After being discharged on March 17, 1947, Harrison returned to the United States and lived in San Francisco on 4612 Nineteenth Street. He and Eugene Bonini, another veteran of the war, opened a hardware store in 1946. The company grew by providing surplus military goods to major governmental institutions and private companies such as the U.S. Navy, local ship repair facilities and commercial businesses, Aerojet General, and Campbell Soup.

In 1950, Harrison founded the On-Off Chemical Corporation, which manufactured and distributed On-Off, a waterless cleaner for hands.

Community service
Harrison was appointed to the Board of Trustees as Vice-President of the War Memorial of San Francisco in 1949 by Mayor Elmer E. Robinson and elected President of the Board of Trustees in December 1954. He was reappointed for five additional six-year terms.

He was the past second Vice-Commander of the American Legion of Zan Irwin Post No. 93; a life member of Veterans of Foreign Wars; a life member of the Military Order of the Purple Heart; Disabled American Veterans Organizer and First Commander of the William Randolph Hearst Chapter No. 144 and Past Commander of the San Francisco Chapter No. 3.

At the request of the Commanding General of Letterman Army Hospital, he engaged in extensive rehabilitation work with wounded Korean War veterans between 1950 and 1956.

Harrison was also a member of the San Francisco Traffic Club (honorary member), State of California Armenian-American Citizen's League (honorary life-member), Commonwealth Club and the American National Committee to Aid Homeless Armenians (ANCHA).

Death

Harrison died on January 1, 1994. He had no children.

Military awards
Harrison's military awards include:

Recognition and legacy
Harrison was nationally named "Hero of the Year" for rehabilitation work by the Disabled American Veterans in 1950.

He was the subject of the article entitled "The Man Who Refused to Die" by Vera Connolly, published in Red Book Magazine, October 1951. The article was reprinted in Reader's Digest, March 1952 and also reprinted in book form by Twayne Publishers and released as an anthology in 1953 entitled "Courage is the Key."

He was deemed as a Knight of the Order of the Compassionate Heart on December 18, 1975.

Harrison was the subject of a radio play entitled "The Empty Sleeve" by Irve Tunick which aired on an hour long nationwide broadcast on August 14, 1951 on the CBS network.

He was the subject of an article "A Universal Experience: My Favorite Story" by Vera Connolly published by the United States Department of Labor and printed by the President's Committee on Employment of the Physically Handicapped.

Former San Francisco mayor Elmer E. Robinson said about Harrison:

References
 Notes

 Bibliography
 
 

1908 births
1994 deaths
American amputees
Businesspeople from Chicago
American people of Armenian descent
United States Army personnel of World War II
20th-century American businesspeople
United States Army soldiers